U.S. Route 275 (US 275) is a north–south United States highway that is a branch of US 75. It originally terminated at US 75 in Council Bluffs, Iowa. The highway's northern terminus is in O'Neill, Nebraska, at an intersection with U.S. Highway 20 and U.S. Highway 281.  Its southern terminus is near Rock Port, Missouri, at an intersection with U.S. Highway 136.

Route description
U.S. 275 is signed north–south in Missouri and Iowa, while in Nebraska, it is signed east–west.

Missouri

Iowa
It enters Hamburg and intersects Iowa Highway 333 (Iowa 333), which connects to Interstate 29 (I-29)  to the west. North of Hamburg, it intersects Iowa 2, and the two routes share  of road. US 275 and Iowa 2 then bypass Sidney on its east side, and east of Sidney, US 275 and Iowa 2 separate. From east of Sidney, US 275 continues north for  through Tabor until it intersects U.S. Route 34 east of Glenwood. West of Glenwood, US 34 and US 275 split at an interchange with I-29; US 34 follows southbound I-29, while US 275 follows northbound I-29. For , US 275 overlaps I-29, ending at an interchange with Iowa 92 in southern Council Bluffs.

Nebraska
US 275 enters Nebraska in Omaha in the South Omaha neighborhood paired with Nebraska Highway 92.  It goes through Omaha as a four-lane highway until meeting Nebraska Highway 31.  The street designations for US 275 in Omaha are, from east to west, Missouri Avenue, L Street, Industrial Road and West Center Road.  It crosses the Elkhorn River, which it will follow for most of the rest of the route, then separates from NE 92.  It goes northwest and becomes freeway until Fremont.  It meets U.S. Route 30 and they are paired together around Fremont until meeting U.S. Route 77.  US 275 turns north with US 77, meets Nebraska Highway 91 and separates from US 77 near Winslow.

It turns northwest with NE 91 and they separate near Scribner, Nebraska.  US 275 goes north through West Point, turns northwest through Wisner, and then turns west.  At Norfolk it meets U.S. Route 81.  It continues west-northwest, meets U.S. Route 20 near Inman and the two routes overlap until US 275 ends at an intersection with U.S. Route 281 in downtown O'Neill.

History

At its creation in 1932, US 275 ran from Council Bluffs to Saint Joseph, Missouri. In 1939 the route was extended northwest into Nebraska. In 1963 US 275 was truncated to its current end in northwestern Missouri.

Prior to 1963, US 275 extended south to St. Joseph.  The route followed current U.S. Route 136 east from Rock Port to its intersection with U.S. Route 59 near Tarkio, then south with US 59 to St. Joseph.

Before November 2001, US 275 ran alongside the Union Pacific tracks between Waterloo and Fremont, Nebraska.  This routing was replaced by a new freeway segment built as part of a project to connect Fremont via freeway to Omaha. This segment is officially called Reichmuth Road in Douglas County and Bell Street in Fremont.

Prior to July 1, 2003, US 275 followed a winding two-lane road between Council Bluffs and Glenwood, Iowa. The segment moved to a concurrency with U.S. Route 34 and Interstate 29 that day as part of a mass decommissioning of highways in Iowa.  This road is now Mills County and Pottawattamie County Road L35.

Major intersections 
Mileposts reset at state line crossings.  In Nebraska, US 275 is considered an east–west highway, its mileposts run from west to east

See also

Related routes
 U.S. Route 75
 U.S. Route 175

Special routes
U.S. Route 275 Business - Fremont, Nebraska

Footnotes

References

External links

Endpoints of US highway 275
Nebraska Transportation On New Bridge

 
75-2
75-2
75-2
75-2
2
Transportation in Atchison County, Missouri
Transportation in Fremont County, Iowa
Transportation in Mills County, Iowa
Transportation in Pottawattamie County, Iowa
Transportation in Douglas County, Nebraska
Transportation in Dodge County, Nebraska
Transportation in Cuming County, Nebraska
Transportation in Stanton County, Nebraska
Transportation in Madison County, Nebraska
Transportation in Antelope County, Nebraska
Transportation in Holt County, Nebraska